Karadaglu may refer to:
 Tsakhkashen, Ararat, Armenia
 Qaradağlı (disambiguation), several places in Azerbaijan